Andy I. Goodway (born 2 June 1961) is a former English professional rugby league footballer and coach. He played for Oldham (two spells), Wigan and Leeds in the Championship and Manly Warringah Sea Eagles in the NSWRL competition. He is a former Great Britain and England international.

Playing career
Andy Goodway played  and scored a try in Wigan's 14-8 victory over New Zealand in the 1985 New Zealand rugby league tour of Great Britain and France match at Central Park, Wigan on Sunday 6 October 1985.

Andy Goodway played  in Wigan's 34-8 victory over Warrington in the 1985 Lancashire Cup Final during the 1985–86 season at Knowsley Road, St. Helens, on Sunday 13 October 1985, played  in the 15-8 victory over Oldham in the 1986 Lancashire Cup Final during the 1986–87 season at Knowsley Road, St. Helens, on Sunday 19 October 1986, played  and was man of the match in the 28-16 victory over Warrington in the 1987 Lancashire Cup Final during the 1987–88 season at Knowsley Road, St. Helens, on Sunday 11 October 1987, and played  in Wigan's 22-17 victory over Salford in the 1988 Lancashire Cup Final during the 1988–89 season at Knowsley Road, St. Helens on Sunday 23 October 1988.

Andy Goodway played  in Wigan's 11-8 victory over Hull Kingston Rovers in the 1985–86 John Player Special Trophy Final during the 1985–86 season at Elland Road, Leeds on Saturday 11 January 1986, played , scored a try, and was man of the match in the 18-4 victory over Warrington in the 1986–87 John Player Special Trophy Final during the 1986–87 season at Burnden Park, Bolton on Saturday 10 January 1987, played as an interchange/substitute (replacing  Adrian Shelford on 20 minutes) in the 12-6 victory over Widnes in the 1988–89 John Player Special Trophy Final during the 1988–89 season at Burnden Park, Bolton on Saturday 7 January 1989, and played as an interchange/substitute (replacing  Ian Gildart on 21 minutes) in the 24-12 victory over Halifax in the 1989–90 Regal Trophy Final during the 1989–90 season at Headingley, Leeds on Saturday 13 January 1990.

Coaching career
He has coached Oldham, Paris Saint-Germain and Wigan Warriors and at international level with both Great Britain and England. In the 1997 post season, Goodway coached Great Britain to a 2-1 loss in the Super League Test series against Australia.

Andy Goodway is an Oldham Hall Of Fame Inductee.

References

External links
Wigan profile
Andy Goodway Wigan Playing Career Page on the Wigan RL Fansite.
Andy Goodway Wigan Coaching Career Page on the Wigan RL Fansite
Oldham Hall of Fame
Statistics at orl-heritagetrust.org.uk

1961 births
Living people
England national rugby league team coaches
England national rugby league team players
English rugby league coaches
English rugby league players
Great Britain national rugby league team captains
Great Britain national rugby league team coaches
Great Britain national rugby league team players
Leeds Rhinos players
Manly Warringah Sea Eagles players
Oldham R.L.F.C. coaches
Oldham R.L.F.C. players
Paris Saint-Germain Rugby League coaches
Rugby league locks
Rugby league players from Yorkshire
Rugby league props
Rugby league second-rows
Wigan Warriors coaches
Wigan Warriors players